The 1976 edition of the Campeonato Carioca kicked off on March 13, 1976 and ended on October 3, 1976. It was organized by FCF (Federação Carioca de Futebol, or Carioca Football Federation). This was the first edition of the championship after the incorporation of Guanabara state by Rio de Janeiro, and as such, the habitual twelve teams were joined by three invitees from the Fluminense championship: Americano, Goytacaz and Volta Redonda, with these being the first teams from outside Rio de Janeiro city to participate in the Carioca championship ever since Canto do Rio had left the league in 1964. Fluminense won the title for the 23rd time. no teams were relegated.

System
The tournament would be divided in four stages:
 Taça Guanabara: The fifteen teams all played in a single round-robin format against each other. The champions qualified to the Final phase.
 Second round: The fifteen teams were divided into two groups, the "winners' group" (Taça José Wânder Rodrigues Mendes) with the best eight teams and the "losers' group" (Taça Josadibe Jappour) with the worst seven teams. each team played in a single round-robin format against the teams of its own group. In the winners' group, the best team qualified to the Final phase, while the worst was relegated into the losers' group for the Third round. In the losers' group, the best team joined the other teams of the winners' group for the Third round.
 Third round: The format for this stage was the same as in the second round, except that the winners of both groups qualified to the Final phase.
Final phase: The remaining four teams played in a single round-robin format against each other. the team with the most points won the title.

Championship

First round

Taça Guanabara

Playoffs

Second round

Taça José Wânder Rodrigues Mendes

Taça Josadibe Jappour

Third round

Taça Amadeu Rodrigues Sequeira

Taça Jayme de Carvalho

Final phase

Playoffs

Top Scorer

References

Campeonato Carioca seasons
Carioca